Paul Andre Banke (born March 1, 1964, in Blythe, California) is a former World Boxing Council Super Bantamweight champion boxer, and is the first American boxer to go public with an AIDS diagnosis.  Having lived 29 years after being diagnosed with AIDS, Banke, who accepted medical treatment, is the longest living professional boxer with the disease.

Career
Banke turned pro in 1985. after losing a 12-round split decision to Daniel Zaragoza in June 1989, Banke captured the WBC Super Bantamweight Title in April 1990 with an upset ninth-round TKO victory over Daniel Zaragoza.  He defended his title once in August 1990 with a twelfth round stoppage of undefeated Ki Hoon Lee in South Korea, knocking Lee down three times. He was knocked down three times in the fourth round, and lost his WBC title to Pedro Ruben Decima by fourth round stoppage in November 1990. Banke lost five of his last six bouts, including a 12-round WBC rematch title loss to Zaragoza in their third meeting. After a ten-round decision loss to winless 0-8 Mexican journeyman Juan Francisco Soto in December 1993, Banke retired at age 29 with a record of 21–9 with 11 knockouts.

Later life
Banke, who battled drug use during his career and overcame it, was diagnosed with AIDS in 1995, approximately two years after his final fight. After returning to drug use, Banke successfully completed a drug rehab program. Banke, who resides in Los Feliz, California, has Chronic traumatic encephalopathy, better known as Dementia Pugilistica, an aftereffect from his professional boxing career. Banke has his own sports radio show, and operates the Paul Banke Against the Ropes Boxing Gym.

References

External links
 

1964 births
Living people
Boxers from California
American male boxers
Super-bantamweight boxers
Sportspeople with chronic traumatic encephalopathy